Madarcos is a municipality of the Community of Madrid, Spain.  It has an area of 8.46 km2 with a population of 49 inhabitants and a density of 5.79 inhabitants / km2 it is the town with the lowest population in the Community of Madrid.

Geography 
It borders the municipalities of the Sierra Horcajo north and northwest; Horcajuelo of the Sierra and the Rincon Prádena east; Puentes Viejas south, and Gandullas Piñuécar- west. At its end is the desert of La Nava, in the hamlet of the same name, to the southeast of the town, on the edge of the M-137 that connects Buitrago del Lozoya with Montejo de la Sierra, past the turning Madarcos.

References

Municipalities in the Community of Madrid